Paweł Bartosz Olszewski (born 11 December 1979 in Bydgoszcz, Poland) is a Polish economist and politician, Bydgoszcz City Councillor (2002–05) and member of the Sejm (since 2005).

Early life and career 

He graduated from Florian Kaja Elementary School No. 32 in Bydgoszcz and Cyprian Norwid Secondary School No. 1 in Bydgoszcz. Afterward, he studied management and marketing (economy policy specialization) in the Faculty of Law and Administration at the Adam Mickiewicz University in Poznań. After his studies, he worked as an export manager at Bydgoska Fabryka Mebli (Furniture Factory in Bydgoszcz). After 2004, he worked as a procurator at Zakłady Mechaniczne Skraw-Mech Sp. z o.o. (LLC). After being elected to the Sejm in 2005, he resigned from this work.

Political career

City Council 
On 27 October 2002 he was elected to the Bydgoszcz City Council (Rada Miasta Bydgoszcz). He received 382 votes in the 3rd district, candidating from Bydgoszcz Civic Agreement list (Bydgoskie Porozumienie Obywatelskie). At 23 years old, he was the youngest member of the Bydgoszcz City Council. BPO's presidential candidate, Konstanty Dombrowicz was elected President. In the city council, Olszewski served as the vice-chairperson of the Budget and Finance Committee and as a member of the European Integration Committee. His term ended in 2005 when he was elected to the Sejm.

Fifth Term Sejm 

On 25 September 2005 he was elected to the Sejm of the Republic of Poland, the lower house of the Polish parliament. He polled 6,850 votes in 4 Bydgoszcz district as a candidate from the Civic Platform list. From 9 November he served as a member of the Economy Committee and the Administration and Internal Affairs Committee. He was a member of the Sejm V Term from 19 October 2005 to 5 November 2007, when his term ended.

Sixth Term Sejm 
On 21 October 2007 he was re-elected to the Sejm. He polled 8,633 votes in 4 Bydgoszcz district as a candidate from the Civic Platform list. He has been a member of Sejm VI Term since 6 November 2007. He has actively worked against the Zawisza Bydgoszcz football club and its fans.

Personal life 
His father Wiesław was also a politician. Wiesław Olszewski was a member of the Democratic Left Alliance and served as the Governor of Bydgoszcz Voivodeship from 1993 to 1997, and as a Bydgoszcz City councillor until 2006.

See also 
List of Sejm members (2005–07)
List of Sejm members (2007–11)
List of Sejm members (2011–15)
List of Sejm members (2015–19)
List of Sejm members (2019–23)

External links 
 (pl) Official website
 (pl) Paweł Olszewski - Sejm V Term page - includes declarations of interest, voting record, and transcripts of speeches.

1979 births
Living people
Members of the Polish Sejm 2005–2007
Members of the Polish Sejm 2007–2011
Members of the Polish Sejm 2011–2015
Members of the Polish Sejm 2015–2019
Members of the Polish Sejm 2019–2023
Members of Bydgoszcz City Council
Civic Platform politicians
People from Bydgoszcz
Adam Mickiewicz University in Poznań alumni